Micropacha is a genus of moths in the family Lasiocampidae. The genus was described by Roepke in 1953.

Species
Micropacha kalisi Roepke, 1953
Micropacha roepkei Holloway, 1987

References

Lasiocampidae